The LNER Class V2 2-6-2 steam locomotive, number 4771 Green Arrow was built in June 1936 for the London and North Eastern Railway (LNER) at Doncaster Works to a design of Nigel Gresley. The first-built and sole surviving member of its class, it was designed for hauling express freight and passenger trains and named after an express freight service.

Operational life
Initially allotted the number 637, it was fitted with curved nameplates over the middle driving wheels. Before entry into LNER service the number was altered to 4771, and the curved nameplates were replaced with straight nameplates mounted on the sides of the smokebox. In order to do this, the builder's plate (Doncaster Works No. 1837) had to be re-located to below the cab windows.

The locomotive was later allocated no. 700 in 1943, but this never carried and was revised to 800 in April 1946, and that number was applied by the LNER in November 1946, and 60800 by British Railways in February 1949.

Preservation

Green Arrow was withdrawn from British Railways service in August 1962, and selected for preservation within the national collection, it was restored at Doncaster Works.

With work completed in April 1963, it was followed by almost ten years of storage, during which it was moved several times. A transfer from Doncaster to Hellifield occurred in October 1964; the locomotive was moved to Wigston in 1967 - this was intended to be the final temporary home, since it was intended that Green Arrow would become one of the permanent exhibits in a Municipal Museum which was proposed for the nearby city of Leicester. However, before the museum was ready, demolition of Wigston locomotive depot was scheduled, and the locomotive was sent south to the Preston Park shops of the Pullman Car Company in September 1970. The National Railway Museum (NRM) was then being planned, and in November 1971 Green Arrow was selected for the National Collection, items from which would form the main display in the NRM. The locomotive was again moved, this time to Norwich depot in January 1972, where it was returned to working order; the first trial trip, to Ely, was on 28 March 1973. It then commenced a series of runs at the head of special trains, before being moved to Carnforth on 2 July 1973. 
In September 1979, Green Arrow headed The Centenary Express, as part of an exhibition tour of the country organised by Travellers Fare to celebrate the centenary of on-train catering. Green Arrow ran in preservation until being withdrawn from service on 21 April 2008, shortly before its boiler certificate expired.

After a series of commemorative runs on preserved railways, the locomotive moved to the North Yorkshire Moors Railway for their LNER gala. Following the first gala weekend the boiler was found to have two cracked superheater tubes; temporary repairs allowed the loco to make a final run on the second weekend before being finally withdrawn. Following this the loco returned to the National Collection and is on static display at the National Railway Museum's Locomotion site at Shildon. In 2015 it was announced that Green Arrow is one of the planned exhibits for the Great Central Railway's proposed railway museum located at Leicester North station.  In February 2021 it was announced that the locomotive had been loaned for 3 years to the newly relocated Danum Gallery.

Models

Bachmann and Graham Farish produce models of Green Arrow for OO gauge and N gauge respectively as part of the 2011 range.

Notes

References

Further reading

External links

North Yorkshire Moors Railway - Notification of Green Arrows final outing

2-6-2 locomotives
Green Arrow
Preserved London and North Eastern Railway steam locomotives
Railway locomotives introduced in 1936